Richelle Mead (born November 12, 1976) is an American fantasy author. She is known for the Georgina Kincaid series, Vampire Academy, Bloodlines and the Dark Swan series.

Education and career
Richelle Mead was born in Michigan, and currently lives in the Seattle suburb of Kirkland, Washington, United States. She has three degrees: a Bachelor of General Studies from the University of Michigan, a Master of Comparative Religion from Western Michigan University, and a Master of Teaching from the University of Washington.  Her teaching degree led her to become an 8th grade teacher in suburban Seattle, where she taught social studies and English.  She continued writing in her free time, until she sold her first novel, Succubus Blues.  After quitting her job to write full-time, her other books quickly followed.

Awards and recognitions
Honorable Mention - 2009 P.E.A.R.L. Awards - Best Romantic Fantasy - Thorn Queen
Winner - 2010 Teen Read Awards - Best Teen Series - Vampire Academy series
Winner - 2010 Goodreads Choice Awards - Goodreads Author - Richelle Mead
Nominee - 2010 Goodreads Choice Awards - Paranormal Fantasy - Succubus Shadows
Nominee - 2011 Kids' Choice Awards - Favorite Book - Vampire Academy series
Winner - 2011 Goodreads Choice Awards - Best Graphic Novels and Comics - Vampire Academy
Nominee - 2011 Goodreads Choice Awards - Favorite Book of 2011 - Bloodlines
Nominee - 2011 Goodreads Choice Awards - Best Paranormal Fantasy - Succubus Revealed
Nominee - 2011 Goodreads Choice Awards - Best Young Adult Fantasy and Science Fiction - Bloodlines
Nominee - 2011 Goodreads Choice Awards - Best Goodreads Author
Winner - 2013 Romantic Times Reviewers' Choice Best Book Awards - YA Protagonist - The Fiery Heart
Nominee - 2013 Romantic Times Reviewers' Choice Best Book Awards - Futuristic Romance Gameboard of the Gods

Bibliography

Novels

Georgina Kincaid series

 Succubus Blues  (February 27, 2007): Nominee - 2007 Reviewers' Choice Awards - Best Urban Fantasy Novel
 Succubus on Top (December 18, 2007) (United Kingdom title: Succubus Nights)
 Succubus Dreams (September 30, 2008)
 Succubus Heat (May 26, 2009)
 Succubus Shadows (March 30, 2010)
 Succubus Revealed (August 30, 2011)

Dark Swan series

 Storm Born (August 5, 2008): Nominee - 2008 Reviewers' Choice Awards - Best Urban Fantasy Novel 
 Thorn Queen (July 28, 2009)
 Iron Crowned (February 22, 2011)
 Shadow Heir (December 27, 2011)

Age of X Series
This series has been dropped by Richelle Mead's publisher and all further books in the series are unlikely to be released.

 Gameboard of the Gods (June 4, 2013)
 The Immortal Crown (May 29, 2014)
 The Eye of Andromeda (not yet released)

Young adult novels

Vampire Academy series

 Vampire Academy (August 16, 2007):Library Association: 2008 Quick Picks for Reluctant Young Adult Readers 
 Frostbite (April 10, 2008): Library Association: 2009 Quick Picks for Reluctant Young Adult Readers 
 Shadow Kiss (November 13, 2008)
 Blood Promise (August 25, 2009)
 Spirit Bound (May 18, 2010)*Nominee - 2011 Children's Choice Book Awards - Teen Choice Book of the Year 
 Last Sacrifice (December 7, 2010)

The first Vampire Academy book was adapted into a movie under the title Vampire Academy in 2014. Mead makes a non-speaking cameo appearances as a teacher in the film. The series was also loosely adapted into a television series in 2022 on Peacock.

Bloodlines series

Mead wrote a six-book spin-off series featuring characters from the Vampire Academy series: Sydney, Jill, Eddie, and Adrian. This spin-off series takes place in the same universe as Vampire Academy.

Bloodlines (August 23, 2011)
The Golden Lily (June 12, 2012)
The Indigo Spell (February 12, 2013)
The Fiery Heart (November 19, 2013)
Silver Shadows (July 29, 2014)
The Ruby Circle (February 10, 2015)

The Glittering Court series
 The Glittering Court (April 5, 2016)
 Midnight Jewel (June 27, 2017)
 The Emerald Sea (June 26, 2018)

Standalone novels
Soundless (November 17, 2015)

Children's novels 
Doctor Who: Something Borrowed, the sixth Puffin E-short featuring the Sixth Doctor and Peri Brown (23 June 2013)

Anthologies 
“Brushstrokes”, Dreams & Desires Vol. 1 (Freya’s Bower, February 2007) (featuring characters from the Georgina Kincaid series)
“City of Demons”, Eternal Lover (Kensington, April 2008) (featuring characters from the Georgina Kincaid series)
“Blue Moon”, Immortal: Love Stories With Bite (BenBella Books, August 2008)
“Sunshine”, Kisses From Hell (HarperTeen, August 2010) (featuring characters from the Vampire Academy series)
"Homecoming", Foretold (August 2012) (featuring characters from Vampire Academy series)

References

External links
 Richelle Mead's official website
 
 
 

21st-century American novelists
21st-century American women writers
American fantasy writers
American writers of young adult literature
American women novelists
1976 births
University of Michigan College of Literature, Science, and the Arts alumni
Western Michigan University alumni
University of Washington College of Education alumni
Writers from Kirkland, Washington
Living people
Women science fiction and fantasy writers
Women writers of young adult literature
Novelists from Washington (state)
Urban fantasy writers
American romantic fiction writers